Sebastian Schwarz (born 2 October 1985) is a German volleyball player, a member of Germany men's national volleyball team and Polish club Jastrzębski Węgiel, a gold medalist of the 2009 European League, a bronze medalist of the 2014 World Championship.

Career

Clubs
On September 4, 2014 it was officially announced that Schwarz had joined the Polish club Lotos Trefl Gdańsk. He signed a one-year contract. On April 19, 2015 Lotos Trefl Gdańsk, including Schwarz, achieved the Polish Cup 2015. Then he won silver medal of Polish Championship. After half of season in Russian Kuzbass Kemerovo he decided to come back to PlusLiga and joined Jastrzębski Węgiel on March 1, 2017.

Sporting achievements

Clubs

CEV Champions League
  2006/2007 - with VfB Friedrichshafen

National championships
 2005/2006  German Cup, with VfB Friedrichshafen
 2005/2006  German Championship, with VfB Friedrichshafen
 2006/2007  German Cup, with VfB Friedrichshafen
 2006/2007  German Championship, with VfB Friedrichshafen
 2008/2009  German Cup, with Generali Unterhaching
 2008/2009  German Championship, with Generali Unterhaching
 2009/2010  German Cup, with Generali Unterhaching
 2009/2010  German Championship, with Generali Unterhaching
 2014/2015  Polish Cup, with Lotos Trefl Gdańsk
 2014/2015  Polish Championship, with Lotos Trefl Gdańsk
 2015/2016  Polish SuperCup 2015, with Lotos Trefl Gdańsk
 2016/2017  Polish Championship, with Jastrzębski Węgiel

National team
 2009  European League
 2014  FIVB World Championship

References

External links
 PlusLiga player profile

1985 births
Living people
People from Freudenstadt
Sportspeople from Karlsruhe (region)
German men's volleyball players
German expatriate sportspeople in Poland
Expatriate volleyball players in Poland
Olympic volleyball players of Germany
Volleyball players at the 2012 Summer Olympics
Trefl Gdańsk players
Jastrzębski Węgiel players
German expatriate sportspeople in Italy
Expatriate volleyball players in Italy
German expatriate sportspeople in Russia
Expatriate volleyball players in Russia